Henry John Deutschendorf Jr. (December 31, 1943 – October 12, 1997), known professionally as John Denver, was an American guitarist, singer, composer, actor, humanitarian, and environmentalist. He is known for popularizing acoustic folk music in the 1970s as part of the ongoing singer-songwriter movement of the mid-to-late 20th century. Denver is widely recognized as a cultural icon of the American West.

After traveling and living in numerous locations while growing up in his military family, Denver began his music career with folk music groups during the late 1960s. Starting in the 1970s, he was one of the most popular acoustic artists of the decade and one of its best-selling artists. By 1974, he was one of America's best-selling performers; AllMusic has called Denver "among the most beloved entertainers of his era".

Denver recorded and released approximately 300 songs, about 200 of which he composed. He had 33 albums and singles that were certified Gold and Platinum in the U.S by the RIAA, with estimated sales of more than 33 million units. He recorded and performed primarily with an acoustic guitar and sang about his joy in nature, disdain for city life, enthusiasm for music, and relationship trials. Denver's music appeared on a variety of charts, including country music, the Billboard Hot 100, and adult contemporary, earning 12 gold and four platinum albums with his signature songs "Take Me Home, Country Roads", "Poems, Prayers & Promises", "Annie's Song", "Rocky Mountain High", "Calypso", "Thank God I'm a Country Boy", and "Sunshine on My Shoulders".

Denver appeared in several films and television specials during the 1970s and 1980s, including the 1977 hit Oh, God!, in which he starred alongside George Burns. He continued to record into the 1990s, also focusing on environmental issues as well as lending vocal support to space exploration and testifying in front of Congress to protest censorship in music. He lived in Aspen for much of his life, and he was known for his love of Colorado. In 1974, Denver was named poet laureate of the state. The Colorado state legislature also adopted "Rocky Mountain High" as one of its two state songs in 2007, and West Virginia did the same for "Take Me Home, Country Roads" in 2014.

An avid pilot, Denver was killed in a single-fatality crash while piloting a recently purchased light plane in 1997 at age 53.

Early life
Henry John Deutschendorf Jr. was born on December 31, 1943, in Roswell, New Mexico, to Captain Henry John "Dutch" Deutschendorf Sr. (1920–1982), a United States Army Air Forces pilot stationed at Roswell Army Air Field, and his wife, Erma Louise (née Swope; 1922–2010).

In his 1994 autobiography, Take Me Home, Denver described his life as the eldest son of a family shaped by a stern father who could not show his love for his children. Because Denver's father was in the military and his family moved often, it was difficult for him to make friends and fit in with other children of his own age. Constantly being the new kid was troubling for the introverted Denver, and he grew up always feeling as though he should be somewhere else, but never knowing where that 'right' place was. While the family was stationed at Davis–Monthan Air Force Base in Tucson, Arizona, the Deutschendorf family purchased a home and lived there from 1951 to 1959, Denver lived in Tucson, Arizona from the age of 6 to the age of 14. During these years he attended Mansfield Junior High School, and was a member of the Tucson Arizona Boys Chorus for two years and received an acoustic guitar at the age of 11 from his grandmother. He was content in Tucson, but his father was then transferred to Maxwell Air Force Base in Montgomery, Alabama, where Denver disliked the racism of his segregated school.

The family later moved to Carswell Air Force Base in Fort Worth, Texas, where Denver graduated from Arlington Heights High School. Living in Fort Worth was a distressing experience for Denver, and in his third year of high school, he drove his father's car to California to visit family friends and begin his music career. His father flew to California in a friend's jet to retrieve him, and Denver reluctantly returned to complete his schooling.

Career

Early career
At age 11, Denver received an acoustic guitar from his grandmother. He learned to play well enough to perform at local clubs by the time he was in college. He decided to change his name when Randy Sparks, founder of the New Christy Minstrels, suggested that 'Deutschendorf' would not fit comfortably on a marquee. Denver attended Texas Tech University in Lubbock and sang in a folk-music group, "The Alpine Trio", while studying architecture. He was also a member of the Delta Tau Delta fraternity. Denver dropped out of Texas Tech in 1963 and moved to Los Angeles, where he sang in folk clubs. In 1965, he joined The Chad Mitchell Trio, replacing founder Chad Mitchell. After more personnel changes, the trio later became known as "Denver, Boise, and Johnson" (John Denver, David Boise, and Michael Johnson).

In 1969, Denver abandoned band life to pursue a solo career and released his first album for RCA Records, Rhymes & Reasons. Two years earlier, he had made a self-produced demo recording of some of the songs he played at his concerts. It included a song he had written called "Babe, I Hate to Go", later renamed "Leaving on a Jet Plane". Denver made several copies and gave them out as presents for Christmas. Milt Okun, who produced records for The Chad Mitchell Trio and folk group Peter, Paul and Mary, had become Denver's producer as well. Okun brought the unreleased "Jet Plane" song to Peter, Paul and Mary. Their rendition hit number one on the Billboard Hot 100. Denver's song also made it to No. 2 in the UK in February 1970, having also made No. 1 on the US Cash Box chart in December 1969.

RCA did not actively promote Rhymes & Reasons with a tour, but Denver embarked on an impromptu supporting tour throughout the Midwest, stopping at towns and cities, offering to play free concerts at local venues. When he was successful in persuading a school, college, American Legion hall, or coffeehouse to let him play, he distributed posters in the town and usually showed up at the local radio station, guitar in hand, offering himself for an interview. As writer of "Leaving on a Jet Plane", he was often successful in gaining some promotional airtime, usually performing one or two songs live. Some venues let him play for the 'door'; others restricted him to selling copies of the album at intermission and after the show. After several months of this, he had built a solid fan base, many of whom remained loyal throughout his career.

Denver recorded two more albums in 1970, Take Me to Tomorrow and Whose Garden Was This, including a mix of songs he had written and covers.

Career peak

Denver's next album, Poems, Prayers & Promises (1971), was a breakthrough for him in the United States, thanks in part to the single "Take Me Home, Country Roads", which went to No. 2 on the Billboard charts despite the first pressings of the track being distorted. Its success was due in part to the efforts of his new manager, future Hollywood producer Jerry Weintraub, who signed Denver in 1970. Weintraub insisted on a reissue of the track and began a radio airplay campaign that started in Denver, Colorado. Denver's career flourished thereafter, and he had a series of hits over the next four years. In 1972, he had his first Top Ten album with Rocky Mountain High, with its title track reaching the Top Ten in 1973. In 1974 and 1975, Denver had a string of four No. 1 songs ("Sunshine on My Shoulders", "Annie's Song", "Thank God I'm a Country Boy", and "I'm Sorry") and three No. 1 albums (John Denver's Greatest Hits, Back Home Again, and Windsong).

In the 1970s, Denver's onstage appearance included long blond hair and wire-rimmed "granny" glasses. His embroidered shirts with images commonly associated with the American West were created by the designer and appliqué artist Anna Zapp. Weintraub insisted on a significant number of television appearances, including a series of half-hour shows in the United Kingdom, despite Denver's protests at the time, "I've had no success in Britain ... I mean none". In December 1976, Weintraub told Maureen Orth of Newsweek: "I knew the critics would never go for John. I had to get him to the people."

After appearing as a guest on many shows, Denver hosted his own variety and music specials, including several concerts from Red Rocks Amphitheatre. His seasonal special, Rocky Mountain Christmas, was watched by more than 60 million people and was the highest-rated show for the ABC network at that time.

His live concert special, An Evening with John Denver, won the 1974–1975 Emmy Award for Outstanding Special, Comedy-Variety or Music. When Denver ended his business relationship in 1982 because of Weintraub's focus on other projects, Weintraub threw Denver out of his office and accused him of Nazism. Denver later told Arthur Tobier, when the latter transcribed his autobiography, "I'd bend my principles to support something he wanted of me. And of course, every time you bend your principles — whether because you don't want to worry about it, or because you're afraid to stand up for fear of what you might lose — you sell your soul to the devil".

Denver was also a guest star on The Muppet Show, the beginning of the lifelong friendship between Denver and Jim Henson that spawned two television specials with the Muppets, A Christmas Together and Rocky Mountain Holiday. He also tried acting, appearing in "The Colorado Cattle Caper" episode of the McCloud television movie in February 1974. He starred in the 1977 film Oh, God! opposite George Burns. Denver hosted the Grammy Awards five times in the 1970s and 1980s, and guest-hosted The Tonight Show on multiple occasions. In 1975, he was awarded the Country Music Association's Entertainer of the Year award. At the ceremony, the outgoing Entertainer of the Year, Charlie Rich, presented the award to his successor after he set fire to the slip of paper containing the official notification of the award. Some speculated Rich was protesting the selection of a non-traditional country artist for the award, but Rich's son disputes that, saying his father was drunk, taking pain medication for a broken foot, and just trying to be funny. Denver's music was defended by country singer Kathy Mattea, who told Alanna Nash of Entertainment Weekly: "A lot of people write him off as lightweight, but he articulated a kind of optimism, and he brought acoustic music to the forefront, bridging folk, pop, and country in a fresh way ... People forget how huge he was worldwide."

In 1977, Denver co-founded The Hunger Project with Werner Erhard and Robert W. Fuller. He served for many years and supported the organization until his death. President Jimmy Carter appointed Denver to serve on the President's Commission on World Hunger. Denver wrote the song "I Want to Live" as the commission's theme song. In 1979, Denver performed "Rhymes & Reasons" at the Music for UNICEF Concert. Royalties from the concert performances were donated to UNICEF. His father taught him to fly in the mid-1970s, which led to their reconciliation. In 1980, Denver and his father, by then a lieutenant colonel, co-hosted an award-winning television special, The Higher We Fly: The History of Flight. It won the Osborn Award from the Aviation/Space Writers' Association, and was honored by the Houston Film Festival.

Political views and activism 
In the mid-1970s, Denver became outspoken in politics. He expressed his ecologic interests in the epic 1975 song "Calypso", an ode to the eponymous exploration ship  used by Jacques Cousteau. In 1976, he campaigned for Carter, who became a close friend and ally. Denver was a supporter of the Democratic Party and of a number of charitable causes for the environmental movement, the homeless, the poor, the hungry, and the African AIDS crisis. He founded the charitable Windstar Foundation in 1976 to promote sustainable living. His dismay at the Chernobyl disaster led to precedent-setting concerts in parts of communist Asia and Europe.

During the 1980s, Denver was critical of the Reagan administration and remained active in his campaign against hunger, for which Reagan awarded Denver the Presidential World Without Hunger Award in 1987. Denver's criticism of the conservative politics of the 1980s was expressed in his autobiographical folk-rock ballad "Let Us Begin (What Are We Making Weapons For?)". In an open letter to the media, he wrote that he opposed oil drilling in the Arctic National Wildlife Refuge. Denver had battled to expand the refuge in the 1980s, and he praised President Bill Clinton for his opposition to the proposed drilling. The letter, which he wrote in the midst of the 1996 United States presidential election, was one of the last he ever wrote. Denver was also on the National Space Society's board of governors for many years.

Later years and humanitarian efforts 
Denver had a few more US Top 30 hits as the 1970s ended, but nothing to match his earlier success. He began to focus more on humanitarian and sustainability causes, focusing extensively on nature conservation projects. He made public expression of his acquaintances and friendships with ecological design researchers such as Richard Buckminster Fuller (about whom he wrote and composed "What One Man Can Do") and Amory Lovins, from whom he said he learned much. He also founded the environmental group Plant-It 2020 (originally Plant-It 2000). Denver had a keen interest in solutions to world hunger. He visited Africa during the 1980s to witness firsthand the suffering caused by starvation and work with African leaders toward solutions.

From 1973 to at least 1979, Denver annually performed at the yearly fundraising picnic for the Aspen Camp School for the Deaf, raising half of the camp's annual operating budget. During the Aspen Valley Hospital's $1.7 million capital campaign in 1979, Denver was the largest single donor.

In 1983 and 1984, Denver hosted the annual Grammy Awards. In the 1983 finale, Denver was joined on stage by folk music legend Joan Baez, with whom he led an all-star version of "Blowin' in the Wind" and "Let the Sunshine In", joined by such diverse musical icons as Jennifer Warnes, Donna Summer, and Rick James.

In 1984, ABC Sports president Roone Arledge asked Denver to compose and sing the theme song for the 1984 Winter Olympics in Sarajevo. Denver worked as both a performer and a skiing commentator, as skiing was another of his enthusiasms. He composed "The Gold and Beyond", and sang it for the Olympic Games athletes, as well as local venues including many schools.

In 1985, Denver asked to participate in the singing of "We Are the World", but was turned down. According to Ken Kragen (who helped to produce the song), Denver was turned down because many people felt his image would hurt the credibility of the song as a pop-rock anthem. "I didn't agree with this assessment", Kragen said, but he reluctantly turned Denver down anyway.

For Earth Day 1990, Denver was the on-camera narrator of a well-received environmental television program, In Partnership With Earth, with then-EPA Administrator William K. Reilly.

Due to his love of flying, he was attracted to NASA and became dedicated to America's work in outer space. He conscientiously worked to help bring into being the "Citizens in Space" program. In 1985 Denver received the NASA Exceptional Public Service Medal for "helping to increase awareness of space exploration by the peoples of the world", an award usually restricted to spaceflight engineers and designers. Also in 1985, he passed NASA's rigorous physical exam and was in line for a space flight, a finalist for the first citizen's trip on the Space Shuttle in 1986. After the Space Shuttle Challenger disaster with teacher Christa McAuliffe aboard, Denver dedicated his song "Flying for Me" to all astronauts, and continued to support NASA. He entered discussions with the Soviet space program about purchasing a flight aboard one of their rockets. The talks fell through after the price tag was rumored to be as high as $20 million.

Denver testified before the Senate Labor and Commerce Committee on the topic of censorship during a Parents Music Resource Center hearing in 1985. Contrary to his innocuous public image as a musician, Denver openly stood with more controversial witnesses like Dee Snider (of the heavy metal band Twisted Sister) and Frank Zappa in opposing the PMRC's objectives. For instance, Denver described how he was censored for "Rocky Mountain High", which was misconstrued as a drug song.

Denver also toured Russia in 1985. His eleven concerts in the USSR were the first by any American artist in more than 10 years. He returned two years later to perform at a benefit concert for the victims of the Chernobyl disaster.

In October 1992, Denver undertook a multiple-city tour of the People's Republic of China. He also released a greatest-hits CD, Homegrown, to raise money for homeless charities. In 1994, he published his autobiography, Take Me Home, in which he candidly spoke of his cannabis, LSD, and cocaine use, marital infidelities, and history of domestic violence. In 1996, he was inducted into the Songwriters Hall of Fame.

In 1997, Denver filmed an episode for the television series Nature, centering on the natural wonders that inspired many of his best-loved songs. His last song, "Yellowstone, Coming Home", composed while rafting along the Colorado River with his son and young daughter, is included. In the summer of 1997, shortly before his death, Denver recorded a children's train album for Sony Wonder, All Aboard!, produced by longtime friend Roger Nichols. The album consisted of old-fashioned swing, big band, folk, bluegrass, and gospel music woven into a theme of railroad songs. It won a posthumous Best Musical Album For Children Grammy, Denver's only Grammy. His final concert was held in Corpus Christi, Texas, at the Selena Auditorium on October 5.

Personal life
Denver's first 1967 marriage was to Annie Martell of St. Peter, Minnesota. She was the subject of his song "Annie's Song", which he composed in ten minutes as he sat on a Colorado ski lift. They lived in Edina, Minnesota, from 1968 to 1971. After the success of "Rocky Mountain High", inspired by a camping trip with Annie and some friends, Denver bought a residence in Aspen, Colorado. He lived in Aspen until his death. The Denvers adopted a boy, Zachary John, and a girl, Anna Kate, who, Denver said, were "meant to be" theirs. Denver once said, "I'll tell you the best thing about me. I'm some guy's dad; I'm some little gal's dad. When I die, Zachary John and Anna Kate's father, boy, that's enough for me to be remembered by. That's more than enough." Zachary was the subject of "A Baby Just Like You", a song that included the line "Merry Christmas, little Zachary" and which he wrote for Frank Sinatra. Denver and Martell divorced in 1982. In a 1983 interview shown in the documentary John Denver: Country Boy (2013), Denver said that career demands drove them apart; Martell said they were too young and immature to deal with Denver's sudden success. He cut their marital bed in half with a chainsaw.

Denver married Australian actress Cassandra Delaney in 1988 after a two-year courtship. Settling at Denver's home in Aspen, the couple had a daughter, Jesse Belle. Denver and Delaney separated in 1991 and divorced in 1993. Of his second marriage, Denver said that "before our short-lived marriage ended in divorce, she managed to make a fool of me from one end of the valley to the other."

In 1993, Denver pleaded guilty to a drunken driving charge and was placed on probation. In August 1994, while still on probation, he was again charged with misdemeanor driving under the influence after crashing his Porsche into a tree in Aspen. Though a July 1997 trial resulted in a hung jury on the second DUI charge, prosecutors later decided to reopen the case, which was closed only after Denver's accidental death in October 1997. In 1996, the Federal Aviation Administration (FAA) determined that Denver was medically disqualified from operating an aircraft due to his failure to abstain from alcohol; in October 1995, following Denver's drunk-driving conviction, the FAA had directed Denver to abstain from alcohol if he wished to continue flying airplanes.

Beyond music, Denver's artistic interests included painting, but because of his limiting schedule he pursued photography, saying once, "photography is a way to communicate a feeling." An exhibition of over 40 never-before-seen photographs taken by Denver debuted at the Leon Gallery in Denver, Colorado, in 2014.

Denver was also an avid skier and golfer, but his principal interest was in flying. His love of flying was second only to his love of music. In 1974, he bought a Learjet to fly himself to concerts. He was a collector of vintage biplanes and owned a Christen Eagle aerobatic plane, two Cessna 210 Centurion airplanes, and a 1997 amateur-built Rutan Long-EZ.

On April 21, 1989, Denver was in a plane accident while taxiing down the runway at Holbrook Municipal Airport in his vintage 1931 biplane. Denver had stopped to refuel on a flight from Carefree, Arizona, to Santa Fe, New Mexico. Reports stated wind gusts caught the plane, causing it to spin around and sustain extensive damage. Denver was unharmed by the incident.

Death

Denver died on the afternoon of October 12, 1997, when his light homebuilt aircraft, a Rutan Long-EZ with registration number N555JD, crashed into Monterey Bay near Pacific Grove, California, while making a series of touch-and-go landings at the nearby Monterey Peninsula Airport. He was the plane's only occupant. The official cause of death was multiple blunt force trauma resulting from the crash.

Denver was a pilot with over 2,700 hours of experience. He had pilot ratings for single-engine land and sea, multi-engine land, glider and instrument. He also held a type rating in his Learjet. He had recently purchased the Long-EZ aircraft, made by someone else from a kit, and had taken a half-hour checkout flight with the aircraft the day before his accident.

Denver was not legally permitted to fly at the time of the crash. In previous years, he had several arrests for drunk driving. In 1996, nearly a year before the accident, the FAA learned that Denver had failed to maintain sobriety by not refraining entirely from alcohol and revoked his medical certification. The accident was not influenced by alcohol use; an autopsy found no sign of alcohol or other drugs in Denver's body.

Post-accident investigation by the National Transportation Safety Board (NTSB) showed that the leading cause of the accident was Denver's inability to switch fuel tanks during flight. The quantity of fuel had been depleted during the plane's flight to Monterey and in several brief practice takeoffs and landings Denver performed at the airport immediately before the final flight. His newly purchased amateur-built Rutan aircraft had an unusual fuel tank selector valve handle configuration. The handle had originally been intended by the plane's designer to be between the pilot's legs. The builder instead put it behind the pilot's left shoulder. The fuel gauge was also placed behind the pilot's seat and was not visible to the person at the controls. An NTSB interview with the aircraft mechanic servicing Denver's plane revealed that he and Denver had discussed the inaccessibility of the cockpit fuel selector valve handle and its resistance to being turned.

Before the flight, Denver and the mechanic had attempted to extend the reach of the handle using a pair of Vise-Grip pliers, but this did not solve the problem, and the pilot still could not reach the handle while strapped into his seat. NTSB officials' post-accident investigation showed that because of the fuel selector valves' positioning, switching fuel tanks required the pilot to turn his body 90 degrees to reach the valve. This created a natural tendency to extend one's right foot against the right rudder pedal to support oneself while turning in the seat, which caused the aircraft to yaw (nose right) and pitch up.

The mechanic said that he told Denver that the fuel sight gauges were visible only to the rear cockpit occupant. Denver had asked how much fuel was shown. He told Denver that there was "less than half in the right tank and less than a quarter in the left tank." He then provided Denver with an inspection mirror so he could look over his shoulder at the fuel gauges. The mirror was later recovered in the wreckage. Denver said that he would use the autopilot in flight to hold the airplane level while he turned the fuel selector valve. He turned down an offer to refuel, saying that he would be flying for about an hour.

The NTSB interviewed 20 witnesses about Denver's last flight. Six of them had seen the plane crash into the bay near Point Pinos. Four said the aircraft was originally heading west. Five said that they saw the plane in a steep bank, with four saying that the bank was to the right (north). Twelve described seeing the aircraft in a steep nose-down descent. Witnesses estimated the plane's altitude between  when heading toward the shoreline. Eight said they heard a "pop" or "backfire" accompanied by a reduction in the engine noise level just before the plane crashed into the sea.

In addition to Denver's failing to refuel and his subsequent loss of control while attempting to switch fuel tanks, the NTSB determined other key factors that led to the accident. Foremost among these was his inadequate transition training on this type of aircraft and the builder's decision to put the fuel selector handle in a hard-to-reach place. The board issued recommendations on the requirement and enforcement of mandatory training standards for pilots operating home-built aircraft. It also emphasized the importance of mandatory ease of access to all controls, including fuel selectors and fuel gauges, in all aircraft.

Legacy

Upon the announcement of Denver's death, Colorado Governor Roy Romer ordered all state flags to be lowered to half-staff in his honor. Funeral services were held at Faith Presbyterian Church in Aurora, Colorado, on October 17, 1997, officiated by Pastor Les Felker, a retired Air Force chaplain, after which Denver's remains were cremated and his ashes scattered in the Rocky Mountains. Further tributes were made at the following Grammy and Country Music Association Awards.

In 1998, Denver posthumously received the Lifetime Achievement Award from the World Folk Music Association, which also established a new award in his honor.

In 2000, CBS presented the television film Take Me Home: The John Denver Story loosely based on his memoirs, starring Chad Lowe as Denver. The New York Post wrote, "An overachiever like John Denver couldn't have been this boring".

On September 23, 2007, nearly ten years after Denver's death, his brother Ron witnessed the dedication of a plaque placed near the crash site in Pacific Grove, California.

Copies of DVDs of Denver's many television appearances are now sought-after collectibles, especially his one-hour specials from the 1970s and his six-part series for Britain's BBC, The John Denver Show. An anthology musical featuring Denver's music, Back Home Again: A John Denver Holiday, premiered at the Rubicon Theatre Company in 2006.

On March 12, 2007, the Colorado Senate passed a resolution to make Denver's trademark 1972 hit "Rocky Mountain High" one of the state's two official state songs, sharing duties with its predecessor, "Where the Columbines Grow". The resolution passed 50–11 in the House, defeating an objection by Representative Debbie Stafford that the song reflected drug use, most specifically in the line "friends around the campfire and everybody's high". Senator Bob Hagedorn, who sponsored the proposal, defended the song as having nothing to do with drugs, but rather everything to do with sharing with friends the euphoria of experiencing the beauty of Colorado's mountain vistas. Senator Nancy Todd said, "John Denver to me is an icon of what Colorado is".

On September 24, 2007, the California Friends of John Denver and The Windstar Foundation unveiled a bronze plaque near the spot where his plane went down. The site had been marked by a driftwood log carved by Jeffrey Pine with Denver's name, but fears that the memorial could be washed out to sea sparked the campaign for a more permanent memorial. Initially, the Pacific Grove Council denied permission for the memorial, fearing the place would attract ghoulish curiosity from extreme fans. Permission was finally granted in 1999, but the project was put on hold at the request of Denver's family. Eventually, over 100 friends and family attended the dedication of the plaque, which features a bas-relief of the singer's face and lines from his song "Windsong": "So welcome the wind and the wisdom she offers. Follow her summons when she calls again."

To mark the 10th anniversary of Denver's death, his family released a set of previously unreleased recordings of his 1985 concert performances in the Soviet Union. This two-CD set, John Denver – Live in the USSR, was produced by Roger Nichols and released by AAO Music. These digital recordings were made during 11 concerts and then rediscovered in 2002. Included in this set is a previously unpublished rendition of "Annie's Song" in Russian. The collection was released November 6, 2007.

On October 13, 2009, a DVD box set of previously unreleased concerts recorded throughout Denver's career was released by Eagle Rock Entertainment. Around the World Live is a 5-disc DVD set featuring three complete live performances with full band from Australia in 1977, Japan in 1981, and England in 1986. These are complemented by a solo acoustic performance from Japan in 1984 and performances at Farm Aid from 1985, 1987, and 1990. The final disc has two-hour-long documentaries made by Denver.

On April 21, 2011, Denver became the first inductee into the Colorado Music Hall of Fame. A benefit concert was held at Broomfield's 1stBank Center and hosted by Olivia Newton-John. Other performers participating in the event included the Nitty Gritty Dirt Band, Lee Ann Womack, and John Oates. Both his ex-wives attended, and the award was presented to his three children.

The John Denver Spirit sculpture is a 2002 bronze sculpture statue by artist Sue DiCicco that was financed by Denver's fans. It is at the Colorado Music Hall of Fame at Red Rocks Amphitheatre.

On March 7, 2014, the West Virginia Legislature approved a resolution to make "Take Me Home, Country Roads" the official state song of West Virginia. Governor Earl Ray Tomblin signed the resolution into law on March 8. Denver is only the second person, along with Stephen Foster, to have written two state songs.

On October 24, 2014, Denver was awarded a star on the Hollywood Walk of Fame in Los Angeles, California.

Related artists
Denver began his recording career with a group that had started as The Chad Mitchell Trio; his distinctive voice can be heard where he sings solo on "Violets of Dawn", among other songs. He recorded three albums with the Trio, replacing Chad Mitchell as high tenor. Denver also wrote a number of songs that were covered by the group, such as his hits "For Bobbi", "Leaving on a Jet Plane", as well as "Deal with The Ladies" (later recorded on his 1988 album, Higher Ground) and "Stay With Me". The group Denver, Boise, and Johnson, which had evolved from The Chad Mitchell Trio, released a single before he moved on to a solo career. The Trio also performed at college campuses across the United States.

Bill Danoff and Taffy Nivert, billed as Fat City and credited as co-writers of Denver's song "Take Me Home, Country Roads", were close friends of Denver and his family, appearing as singers and songwriters on many of Denver's albums until they formed the Starland Vocal Band in 1976. The band's albums were released on Denver's Windsong Records label, later known as Windstar Records.

Denver's solo recording contract resulted in part from the recording by Peter, Paul, and Mary of his song "Leaving on a Jet Plane", which became the sole number-one hit single for the group. Denver recorded songs by Tom Paxton, Eric Andersen, John Prine, David Mallett, and many others in the folk scene. His record company, Windstar, is still an active record label today. Country singer John Berry considers Denver the greatest influence on his own music and has recorded Denver's hit "Annie's Song" with the original arrangement.

Olivia Newton-John, an Australian singer whose across-the-board appeal to pop, middle-of-the-road, and country audiences in the mid-1970s was similar to Denver's, lent her distinctive backup vocals to Denver's 1975 single "Fly Away"; she performed the song with Denver on his 1975 Rocky Mountain Christmas special. She also covered his "Take Me Home, Country Roads", and had a hit in the United Kingdom (#15 in 1973) and Japan (#6 in a belated 1976 release) with it. In 1976, Denver and Newton-John appeared as guest stars on The Carpenters' Very First Television Special, a one-hour special broadcast on the ABC television network.

Awards and recognition
Academy of Country Music
1974 Album of the Year for Back Home Again

American Music Awards
1975 Favorite Pop/Rock Male Artist
1976 Favorite Country Album for Back Home Again
1976 Favorite Country Male Artist
Country Music Association
1975 Entertainer of the Year
1975 Song of the Year for "Back Home Again"

Emmy Awards
1975 Emmy for Outstanding Variety, Music or Comedy Special for An Evening with John Denver

Grammy Awards
1997 Best Musical Album For Children for All Aboard!
1998 Grammy Hall of Fame Award for "Take Me Home, Country Roads"

Songwriters Hall of Fame
Inducted in 1996

Other recognition
 Poet laureate of Colorado, 1977
 People's Choice Awards, 1977
 Ten Outstanding Young Americans, 1979
 Freedoms Foundation Award, Valley Forge, Pennsylvania, 1980
 Carl Sandburg's People's Poet Award, 1982
 NASA Exceptional Public Service Medal, 1985
 Albert Schweitzer Music Award, 1993

Discography

Studio albums

 John Denver Sings (1966)
 Rhymes & Reasons (1969)
 Take Me to Tomorrow (1970)
 Whose Garden Was This (1970)
 Poems, Prayers & Promises (1971)
 Aerie (1971)
 Rocky Mountain High (1972)
 Farewell Andromeda (1973)
 Back Home Again (1974)
 Windsong (1975)
 Rocky Mountain Christmas (1975)
 Spirit (1976)
 I Want to Live (1977)
 John Denver (1979)
 Autograph (1980)
 Some Days Are Diamonds (1981)
 Seasons of the Heart (1982)
 It's About Time (1983)
 Dreamland Express (1985)
 One World (1986)
 Higher Ground (1988)
 Earth Songs (1990)
 The Flower That Shattered the Stone (1990)
 Different Directions (1991)
 All Aboard! (1997)

Filmography

Acting credits

 Owen Marshall, Counselor at Law: The Camerons Are A Special Clan (1973, as Clark)
The Muppet Show as special guest
McCloud: The Colorado Cattle Caper (1974, as Deputy Dewey Cobb)
 Oh, God! (1977, as Jerry Landers)
 Fire and Ice (1986, as Narrator)
 The Disney Sunday Movie: The Leftovers (1986, as Max Sinclair)
 The Christmas Gift (1986, as George Billings)
 Foxfire (1987, as Dillard Nations)
 Higher Ground (1988, as Jim Clayton)
 Walking Thunder (1997, as John McKay)

Selected writings
The Children and the Flowers (1979) 
Alfie the Christmas Tree (1990) 
Take Me Home: An Autobiography (1994) 
Poems, Prayers and Promises: The Art and Soul of John Denver (2004)

References

Sources
Flippo, Chet (1998) "John Denver", The Encyclopedia of Country Music, Paul Kingsbury, editor, New York: Oxford University Press. p. 143.
Martin, James M. (1977) John Denver: Rocky Mountain Wonderboy, Pinnacle Books. (out of print) Biography of Denver with insight into Denver's impact of the 1970s music industry.
Orth, Maureen, "Voice of America", Newsweek, December 1976. Includes information on the role of Weintraub in shaping Denver's career, which has since been edited out of later versions of his biography.

External links

 

John Denver's childhood home in Tucson Arizona website

 
1943 births
1997 deaths
Accidental deaths in California
American acoustic guitarists
American autobiographers
American country guitarists
American country singer-songwriters
American environmentalists
American folk guitarists
American folk-pop singers
American folk singers
American glider pilots
American humanitarians
American male guitarists
American male film actors
American male singer-songwriters
American male television actors
American people of German descent
Articles containing video clips
Aviators killed in aviation accidents or incidents in the United States
Ballad musicians
Colorado culture
Colorado Democrats
Country musicians from Colorado
Grammy Award winners
Guitarists from New Mexico
People from Aspen, Colorado
People from Roswell, New Mexico
Poets Laureate of Colorado
Texas Tech University alumni
Mercury Records artists
Musicians killed in aviation accidents or incidents
New Mexico Democrats
RCA Records artists
People named in the Paradise Papers
Singers from Denver
Singers from New Mexico
Singer-songwriters from Colorado
Songwriters from New Mexico
Victims of aviation accidents or incidents in 1997
20th-century American guitarists
20th-century American male actors
20th-century American male singers
20th-century American male writers
20th-century American poets
20th-century American singers